Munem Wasif (born 11 April 1983) is a photographer from Bangladesh.

Biography
Munem Wasif is a documentary photographer in Bangladesh. He has been represented by Agence Vu since 2008, and is now teaching documentary photography at Pathshala South Asian Media Academy.

He was selected for the World Press Photo Joop Swart Masterclass in 2007. In 2008, he won the City of Perpignan Young Reporter's Award at Visa pour l'image. That year, he also won the International Award for concerned photography, the F25 for under-25's in the Fabrica awards. The following year, he was awarded the Prix Pictet commission for his work on the water crisis of the north-west region of Bangladesh.

His work has been exhibited worldwide, including at the Musée de l'Élysée, and the Fotomuseum Winterthur in Switzerland, the International Photography Biennial of the Islamic World in Iran, Tokyo Metropolitan Museum of Photography in Japan, the Kunsthal Museum and the  Noorderlicht festival in the Netherlands, Angkor photo festival in Cambodia, London's Whitechapel Gallery, Palais de Tokyo, Visa pour l'image in France, and at Chobi Mela, Bangladesh.

Wasif's photographs have been published in Le Monde 2, the Sunday Times Magazine, The Guardian, Politiken, Io Donna, Mare, Du, Days Japan, L'espresso, Libération, Courier International, Photo, British Journal of Photography, LensCulture, Photo District News and Zonezero.
Wasif began his career as a feature photographer for The Daily Star newspaper, Bangladesh, after graduating from Pathshala.

During his residency he told the Centre for Contemporary Art Singapore about his film "Goom" which literary translates in English to "Forced Disappearance" 
It says "Prompted by recent shifts in the political climate of his own country, Munem Wasif is currently working on a film project titled Goom (forced disappearance, kidnapping in Bangla.)". The work revolves around the increasing phenomenon of people gone missing, disappearances that often remain unexplained and unaccounted for.

Family
Munem Wasif is the son of Bangladeshi politician Abdul Matin Khasru.

Publications

Books by Wasif
 Bangladesh Standing on the Edge. Paris: CDP, 2008. . With texts by Agnès de Gouvion Saint-Cyr and Christian Caujolle in French and English.
 Salt Water Tears: Lives Left behind in Satkhira, Bangladesh. London: Prix Pictet, 2009. .
 Larmes salées = Salty Tears. Marseille: Images Plurielles, 2011. . With texts by Pavel Partha and Francis Hodgson in French and English.
 Belonging. Paris: Clémentine de la Féronnière, 2013. . With text by Christian Caujolle in French and English.

Books with contributions by Wasif
 Under the Banyan Tree. Dhaka: Pathshala, 2010. .
 Street Photography Now. London: Thames & Hudson, 2010. .

Grants and awards

 Sagamihara photo Asian Prize by Sagamihara photo festival, Japan. 2010
 Prix Pictet commission on water, France, 2009
 City of Perpignan Young Reporter's Award, Visa pour l'Image, France, 2008
 F25, International Award for concerned photography, Italy, 2008
 30 emerging photographers by Photo District News, USA, 2008
 Young reporter award by Festival du Scoop of Angers, France, 2008
 Joop Swart Masterclass by World Press Photo, Netherland, 2007

References

External links
 
 Munem Wasif in Agence VU
 Interview in French culture radio by Amaury Chardeau, 2012
 Artist talk in Delhi Photo Festival, India, 2011
 Thinking locally in British Journal of Photography, 2010
 Photography caught amid sea and swamp in Financial Times, 2009
 Death of the golden fibre, Chobimela V, The Daily star, 2009

1983 births
Living people
Bangladeshi photographers
Bangladeshi male writers